Johan Petersson may refer to:
 Johan Petersson (handballer), Swedish handball player
 Johan Petersson (comedian), Swedish comedian, actor, television presenter and author

See also
 Johan Pettersson (disambiguation)